Deleitosa is a municipality located in the province of Cáceres, Extremadura, Spain. , according to the (INE) census the municipality had a population of 834 inhabitants. In 1950 during the Francoist era, W. Eugene Smith visited Deleitosa to show the poverty of Spain in photographs.

References

Municipalities in the Province of Cáceres

External links

 Spanish regions: Extrmadura